Dowling Lake is a lake in Alberta, Canada.

Dowling Lake was named for D. B. Dowling, a government surveyor.

See also
List of lakes of Alberta

References

Lakes of Alberta